The Laos national badminton team represents Laos in international badminton team competitions. It is managed by the Badminton Lao Federation (abbreviated as BLF). The Laotian team participated in the Southeast Asian Games and won three bronze medals in 1959 and 1961. 

The national team have never reached the semifinals of any team event. The national team also competes in the Lao International, also known as the BEERLAO International Series.

History 
Badminton has been played in Laos since the early 20th century. The national team was formed in February 1955 after the formation of the Badminton Lao Federation which was then called Association de Badminton du Royaume de Laos. The Laotian team then competed in local sport events. Laos won their first few medals in badminton at the 1959 Southeast Asian Peninsular Games when Boonpheng Siaksone and Tiock won bronze in men's doubles. Since 2007, Laos has competed in the Southeast Asian Games team events.

Men's team 
Laos debuted at the 2007 Southeast Asian Games. The team has had multiple quarter-final defeats. The team lost 0-3 to Thailand in 2007. In 2009, the team had a bye in a first round but lost 0-3 to Indonesia in the quarter-finals. The team lost in the quarter-finals in the next few editions of the games.

Women's team 
The Laotian women's team first competed at the 2007 Southeast Asian Games. The women's team had the same fate as the men's team when they also lost in the quarter-finals to Thailand. In 2009, the team lost 0-3 to Singapore.

Competitive record

SEA Games

Men's team

Women's team

Junior competitive record

Asian Junior Team Championships

Mixed team

ASEAN School Games

Boys' team

Girls' team

Staff 
The following list shows the coaching staff for the Laos national badminton team.

Players

Current squad

Men's team

Women's team

References 

Badminton
National badminton teams
Badminton in Laos